William G. Holt II is a United States Air Force major general who serves as the vice commander of the Air University since May 24, 2021. He most recently served as the director for operations, training, and force development of the United States Space Command. Previously, he was the director of the joint space operations development for the same combatant command. He also served as the special assistant to the commander of the Air Force Special Operations Command. In February 2021, he was assigned to replace Major General Brad M. Sullivan as vice commander of the Air University.

References 

Living people
Year of birth missing (living people)
Place of birth missing (living people)
United States Air Force generals
Brigadier generals